Stuffed dates are boiled or heated dates filled with meat, mint and parsley, with different and modern stuffing including butters and goat cheese. It is a popular Levantine dish and is served on rice or bulgur. Variations can include fresh or dried dates.

See also
 List of stuffed dishes

References
 

Arab cuisine
Israeli cuisine
Jewish cuisine
Jordanian cuisine
Lebanese cuisine
Levantine cuisine
Palestinian cuisine
Syrian cuisine
Stuffed vegetable dishes